Like many early officials in Canada little is known of Stephen Heward beyond his roles as a public official in Upper Canada after serving earlier in the British Army.

Before and during his posting as Auditor General of Land Patents Heward held a number of posts:
 Clerk of the Peace for the Home District 1811-1828?
 Clerk of the Receiver General's Office 1815-1828
 Registrar General of the Court of Probate 1816-1828
 District Court Clerk for the Home District 1818-1828

Heward served during the War of 1812 as Captain in the 3rd York Militia and promoted as Major at end of the conflict. For his military service he obtained land in Simcoe County.

Legacy

Heward Avenue in Toronto named for him.

References

1777 births
1828 deaths
People from Cumberland